Damat Ibrahim Pasha (1517–1601) was an Ottoman military commander and statesman who held the office of grand vizier three times (the first time from 4 April to 27 October 1596; the second time from 5 December 1596 to 3 November 1597; and for the third and last time, from 6 January 1599 to 10 July 1601. He is known as the conqueror of Kanije.

Born at Mehmed-Kanije, on 28 May 1517, he attended military schools in several cities of the Ottoman Empire before being enlisted in the Ottoman army. After graduating, he was in active service during the Battle of Keresztes
in October 1596, and held the position of grand vizier under Sultan Mehmed III until his death in 1601.

He is also called with the title damat ("bridegroom"), because he was a bridegroom to the Ottoman dynasty by marrying Ayşe Sultan, one of the sultan's daughters. By her he had a son, Sultanzade Mehmed Bey (died in infancy), and a daughter (died as newborn). He is not to be confused with either Pargalı Ibrahim Pasha, illustrious grand vizier of Suleiman the Magnificent, another devşirme and "Damat" to the Ottoman court, or with Nevşehirli Damat Ibrahim Pasha, who held office in early 18th century during the Tulip Era in the Ottoman Empire.

Biography
According to Turkish sources, he was "Bosnian or Croatian" and went through the Devşirme system. According to the contemporary Italian historian Giovanni Minadoi, Ibrahim Pasha became acquainted with the Venetian deputy consul of Aleppo, Chrestefero de Boni, once Ibrahim Pasha discovered they were both from Ragusa in modern Croatia.

He rose in the ranks during the period when virtual authority and influence was held by Sokollu Mehmed Pasha. In 1581, shortly after Mehmed Pasha's death, Ibrahim Pasha married Ayşe, daughter of the reigning Murad III and became governor of Egypt. But due to his absence from the capital and with Sokollu Mehmed Pasha dead, his influence waned for the rest of the reign of Murad III. 

He made a comeback under the reign of Mehmed III, becoming grand vizier in 1596 for the first time. His recall was particularly due to the loss of territories in the border regions between the Ottoman Empire and the Habsburg monarchy in Hungary. Rather than dashing toward immediate action, he distinguished himself as an orderly, methodical, and prudent statesman who preferred to start by conducting a review of the entire Ottoman administrative system based on the focal point of the prepared campaign against Austria. The campaign as such proved a success and the Ibrahim Pasha acquired the title of "the conqueror of Eger" (north-east of Budapest) for his sultan, although he was the one who held the effective command. Since he favored solidifying the state structure and the gains acquired rather than pursuing Austrians, for which he has been dismissed from the post of grand vizier, at first for a short interval of forty-five days at the end of 1596, and then for a second time at the end of the following year.

 He was called back to the grand vizier post in 1599 on the condition that he was to launch a campaign against Austria. He started his campaign by feigning to menace Vienna directly by heading toward Esztergom (conquered by Suleiman the Magnificent in 1543 and lost back in 1595) but finally spent the winter in Belgrade.  Then he began to put pressure on Austria through a more southern route by besieging the castle of Kanije. The Ottoman slaves in the castle exploded the powder magazines and very badly damaged the walls. But the castle had still not surrendered and an army of 20,000 soldiers commanded by Philippe Emmanuel, Duke of Mercœur arrived to the assistance of the besieged. But the Ottoman Army finally defeated both of the armies and the castle surrendered. Tiryaki Hasan Pasha had been appointed as the governor of the newly conquered city. 

Kanije had been transformed into the centre of new Ottoman attacks in Central Europe. In September 1601, an attempt by a huge Austrian army to take back the castle was thwarted by the governor Tiryaki Hasan Pasha. Damat Ibrahim Pasha died the same year. Esztergom was retaken by the Ottoman Empire in 1605.

See also
 List of Ottoman Grand Viziers
 List of Ottoman governors of Egypt
 Pictures of the mosque in Istanbul

References

1517 births
1601 deaths
16th-century Grand Viziers of the Ottoman Empire
16th-century Ottoman governors of Egypt
Ottoman governors of Egypt
Bosnian Muslims from the Ottoman Empire
Devshirme
Slavs from the Ottoman Empire
Pashas
Damats
People of the Long Turkish War
People from Dubrovnik